Pesan (also Romanized as Pesān; also known as Yesān) is a village in Targavar Rural District, Silvaneh District, Urmia County, West Azerbaijan Province, Iran. At the 2006 census, its population was 402, in 76 families.

References 

Populated places in Urmia County